President of the Supreme Court of Spain
 President of the Supreme Court of the United Kingdom
 President of the Supreme Court of Albania
 President of the Supreme People's Court of the People's Republic of China
 Chief Justice of the United States